My Girlfriend's Boyfriend may refer to:

My Girlfriend's Boyfriend (1987 film), English title of French comedy L'Ami de mon amie, directed by Éric Rohmer
My Girlfriend's Boyfriend (1998 film), American screwball comedy, directed by Kenneth Schapiro
My Girlfriend's Boyfriend (2010 film), American romantic comedy, directed by Daryn Tufts
My Girlfriend's Boyfriend, 2011 stand-up comedy special by Mike Birbiglia